Collected Ghost Stories is a posthumous collection of stories by author Mary E. Wilkins Freeman (1852–1930). It was released in 1974 by Arkham House in an edition of 4,155 copies. The book is the first collection of all of Freeman's supernatural stories.

Contents

Collected Ghost Stories contains the following tales:

 "Introduction," by Edward Wagenknecht
 "The Shadows on the Wall"
 "The Hall Bedroom"
 "Luella Miller"
 "The Vacant Lot"
 "A Far-Away Melody"
 "A Symphony in Lavender"
 "The Wind in the Rose-Bush"
 "A Gentle Ghost"
 "The Southwest Chamber"
 "The Lost Ghost"
 "The Jade Bracelet"

References

1974 short story collections
Fantasy short story collections
Horror short story collections
Short story collections by Mary E. Wilkins Freeman
American short story collections
Arkham House books